Texarkana School District may refer to:
 Texarkana Arkansas School District
 Texarkana Independent School District (Texas)